Shichijo Bridge is a bridge in Kyoto, Japan.

External links
 

Bridges in Japan
Buildings and structures in Kyoto